Davis Creek is a stream in Lafayette and Saline counties in the U.S. state of Missouri. It is a tributary of the Blackwater River.

Davis Creek was named after members of the Davis family of pioneer citizens.

See also
List of rivers of Missouri

References

Rivers of Lafayette County, Missouri
Rivers of Saline County, Missouri
Rivers of Missouri